The Bannick Model T of the Air was the first of series of homebuilt autogyro designs.

Design and development
The Bannick Copter is a homebuilt autogyro design of the early 1960s similar to the more popular Bensen B-8 design. The airframe is constructed of aluminum tubing with a tricycle landing gear.

Variants
Bannick Model T of the Air
 Lycoming O-145B single place
Bannick Model C Copter
 two place with fiberglass streamlining
Bannick Model VW Copter
Volkswagen air-cooled engine version

Specifications (Bannick 125hp two place)

See also

References

Homebuilt aircraft
Single-engined pusher autogyros